Thuravoor commonly refers to:
 Thuravoor, Cherthala
 Thuravoor, Angamaly